Sir Keith Burnett, CBE,  FRS FLSW (born 30 September 1953) is a British physicist and President Elect of the Institute of Physics. He is Chair of the Nuffield Foundation — an independent charitable trust with a mission to advance educational opportunity and social well-being, founding Chair of the Academic Council the Schmidt Science Fellows, and a member of the Board of international education providers Study Group.

Burnett is past Vice-Chancellor of the University of Sheffield. Burnett announced his retirement in January 2018 and he stepped down in September of that year when he was succeeded by Koen Lamberts. He received an Honorary degree from the University of Sheffield in July 2022. He is an honorary fellow of Jesus College, Oxford and St John's College, Oxford where he was a tutorial fellow for 20 years.

Burnett has a long-standing commitment to vocational and technical education, advocating for the development of high-level vocational education and apprenticeships and serving as the President of the Science Council and on the board of the National Technician Development Centre and of Heated.

Biography
Burnett was born in Llwynypia in the Rhondda Valley.  He studied Physics at Jesus College, Oxford obtaining a BA degree in 1975 then a DPhil degree in 1979.  He held academic positions in Physics at the University of Colorado, Imperial College and the University of Oxford before taking up the role of vice chancellor at the University of Sheffield in 2007. During his time at the University of Oxford he was appointed Chairman of Physics and then Head of the Division of Mathematical, Physical and Life Sciences.  His research includes the study of Bose–Einstein condensates.

Memberships
He was Chair of the board of the Universities and Colleges Employers Association (UCEA) from October 2009 to September 2011.

On 1 November 2010 he was appointed as a non-executive director of the United Kingdom Atomic Energy Authority, a position he was due to hold until October 2013.

He is also currently a member of the United Kingdom government's Council for Science and Technology, and in September 2016 was elected president of the Science Council. He was appointed to the Advisory Council of Infrastructure UK in 2012 to advise the UK treasury on investments including on energy, transport, waste, flood, science, water and telecoms. In March 2015 he joined the management board of HEFCE. In 2021 he was elected President-elect of the Institute of Physics, serving on the IoP Council until taking up the post of President in 2023.

Personal
He is married and has two children. His interests include the Chinese language and culture.

Honours
He was awarded the Young Medal and Prize in 1997 for his physics research and in 2001 was elected a Fellow of the Royal Society. He was appointed Commander of the Order of the British Empire (CBE) in 2004 for services to physics, and knighted for services to science and higher education in the 2013 New Year Honours.

External links
Scientific Commons Keith Burnett

References

British physicists
Welsh physicists
Fellows of the Royal Society
Commanders of the Order of the British Empire
Knights Bachelor
Academics of Imperial College London
Academics of the University of Sheffield
Alumni of Jesus College, Oxford
Fellows of St John's College, Oxford
University of Colorado faculty
Living people
1953 births
People from Llwynypia
People educated at Ysgol Brynteg
20th-century British physicists
20th-century Welsh scientists
21st-century British physicists
21st-century Welsh scientists
Fellows of the American Physical Society
Vice-Chancellors of the University of Sheffield